Ercaia is genus of Cambrian arthropod known for being a member of the Chengjiang biota, containing the single species E. minuscula. It has been suggested to be one of the oldest crustaceans ever found.

See also

 Arthropod
 Cambrian explosion
 Chengjiang biota
 List of Chengjiang Biota species by phylum

References

Cambrian animals
Maotianshan shales fossils
Prehistoric arthropod genera

Cambrian genus extinctions